Olivier Harouna Bonnes (born 7 February 1990) is a Nigerien international footballer who plays as a defensive midfielder for Nonthaburi United.

Club career
Born in Niamey, Bonnes has played in France and Belgium for Nantes B, Nantes, Lille B and Brussels.

On 24 September 2014, Bonnes signed with Bulgarian club Vereya. He also played in Bulgaria for Lokomotiv Plovdiv and Montana.

On 25 July 2016, Bonnes signed with South Korean club Gwangju FC.

In July 2018, Bonnes signed with South Korean club Seongnam FC.

In February 2019 he moved to Uzbek club Kokand 1912.

International career
Bonnes made his international debut for Niger in 2011, earning a total of 9 caps with them between 2011 and 2012, including one appearance in a FIFA World Cup qualifying match. He played at the 2012 Africa Cup of Nations.

Personal life
He also has French nationality.

References

External links
 
 

1990 births
Living people
People from Niamey
Nigerien footballers
Niger international footballers
FC Nantes players
Lille OSC players
R.W.D.M. Brussels F.C. players
FC Vereya players
PFC Lokomotiv Plovdiv players
FC Montana players
Gwangju FC players
Hwaseong FC players
Ligue 2 players
K League 1 players
K League 2 players
First Professional Football League (Bulgaria) players
Association football midfielders
Nigerien expatriate footballers
Nigerien expatriate sportspeople in France
Expatriate footballers in France
Nigerien expatriate sportspeople in Belgium
Expatriate footballers in Belgium
Nigerien expatriate sportspeople in Bulgaria
Expatriate footballers in Bulgaria
Nigerien expatriate sportspeople in South Korea
Expatriate footballers in South Korea
Expatriate footballers in Uzbekistan
Nigerien expatriate sportspeople in Uzbekistan